Rebecca Latham (born 23 June 1997) is an American volleyball player, originally from Austin, Texas, who has played in Italy and is currently playing in South Korea.

She currently plays for Hwaseong IBK Altos in the Korean V-League.

Rebecca began playing volleyball at the age of 8, and  continued training and competing at McNeil High School and Austin Junior Volleyball Club in Austin, Texas. She was later recruited to play for University of Denver where she played as an Opposite for all four years during college.

After graduation, Rebecca signed with Top Volley srl and began her professional career.

References

External links
  at Volleybox

1997 births
Living people
People from Austin, Texas
Sportspeople from Austin, Texas
American women's volleyball players
21st-century American women